Oiceoptoma is a genus of carrion beetles.

Species
 Oiceoptoma hypocritum
 Oiceoptoma inaequale
 Oiceoptoma nakabayashii
 Oiceoptoma nigropunctatum
 Oiceoptoma noveboracense
 Oiceoptoma picescens
 Oiceoptoma rugulosum
 Oiceoptoma subrufum
 Oiceoptoma thoracicum

Silphidae